Eagle Claw (pinyin: yīng zhǎo pài; eagle claw school) is a style of Chinese martial arts known for its gripping techniques, system of joint locks, takedowns, and pressure point strikes, which is representative of Chinese grappling known as Chin Na. The style is normally attributed to the famous patriotic Song dynasty General Yue Fei. Popular legends states that he learned martial arts from a Shaolin Monk named Zhou Tong and later created Eagle Claw to help his armies combat the invading armies of the Jin dynasty. It was passed down until the Ming dynasty. Thus, the style took on long range strikes and aerial jumps. During the Qing dynasty, the military instructor Liu Shi Jun became known as the modern progenitor of Eagle Claw and taught many students. His student Liu Cheng You later taught Chen Zizheng who was invited to teach the style in the prestigious Chin Woo Athletic Association during the Republican era. The style spread as Chin Woo opened sister schools in other provinces. Today, it is practiced around the world.

History
While the details of the history alter according to the teller, with names and places shifting as they tend to do in any oral history, in essence the story of Eagle Claw began in the Shaolin Temple and in Chinese military training, became a family tradition passed on from parent to child for generations and eventually shed its air of secrecy with the advent of public martial arts schools.

Yue Fei

The creation of the Eagle Claw method is normally attributed to General Yue Fei (1103–1141) who lived at a time of conflict between the Southern Song dynasty and the Jurchen tribes of the Jin dynasty. Despite being literate, young Yue Fei chose the military path because there had never been any tradition of full-fledged Confucian civil service in his family history. However, the Yue family was much too poor to afford military lessons for their son, so the boy's maternal grandfather Yao Dewang hired Chen Guang (陈广) to teach the eleven-year-old how to wield the Chinese spear. Then a local knight errant named Zhou Tong (周同) was brought in to continue Yue's military training in archery after he had quickly mastered the spear by the age of thirteen.

None of Yue Fei's biographies mention him learning boxing as a child, but martial researcher Stanley Henning states "[Yue] almost certainly did practice some form of bare handed fighting as a basic foundation for use of weapons." However, he doesn't venture to guess if either of his teachers or someone else taught him boxing. Despite this, many modern day martial arts masters have assigned Zhou Tong this position. For instance, the internalist Yang Jwingming claims Zhou was a scholar who trained at the famed Shaolin temple and later taught Yue other skills beyond archery, such as various forms of internal and external martial arts. Yang believes this later led to Yue's creation of Eagle Claw and Xingyi, another style associated with the general. The history that Yang presents does not mention the spearplayer Chen Guang and erroneously casts Zhou as Yue's only teacher. Eagle Claw proponent Leung Shum does this as well and goes so far as to claim Zhou was a full-fledged Shaolin monk who trained Yue Fei inside of the temple itself. Leung believes Zhou taught him "Elephant Style" which the general later expanded to create the "'108 Locking Hands Techniques' or Ying Sao (Eagle Hand)." There is no evidence that Zhou was ever associated with the Shaolin Temple, though.

The general's biographies are also silent about him creating any styles of his own. The historian Meir Shahar notes Yue's mention in the second preface of the Sinew-Changing Classic (1624) is what "spurred a wave of allusions to the patriotic hero in later military literature". He continues, "By the eighteenth century, Yue Fei had been credited with the inventions of Xingyi Quan, and by the nineteenth century the 'Eight Section Brocade' and weapon techniques were attributed to him as well." The Ten Compilations on Cultivating Perfection (Xiuzhen shi-shu) (c. 1300) assigns the creation of the Eight Section Brocade to two of the Eight Immortals, namely Zhongli Quan and Lü Dongbin.

Shape-Mimicking Fist
In Chinese, pronounced Xiàng (象) means "shape, form, or appearance". 象形拳, Xiang Xing Quan, literally means "Imitation Boxing" or "Shape-Mimicking Fist". It is a fighting technique which emphasizes the imitation of the offensive and defensive actions of a certain animal characteristic or celestial personage. In the relevance of the Ying Zhao Fan Tzi system the Xiang refers to moving or movement within the walking fist routine Xiang Quan Shi Lu

Xiang Xing Quan is an umbrella term for any martial arts that mimics characteristic/ forms/ movement/ action from anything other than human, and there are more than one school of kungfu practicing imitation boxing. Example of the animal style: Dragon, Tiger, Panther, Snake, Crane style (that falls under Hung Gar) Eagle Style Chin Na, horse, Mantis Boxing and so on.

Shaolin

According to legend, in the late Ming dynasty Yue Fei's material is said to have made a re-appearance at one of the sister schools of the Shaolin temple. Lai Chin/Liquan Seng (麗泉僧), an expert in the Bashanfan boxing method, encountered soldiers practicing the hand techniques that was called Yue Shi San Shou (岳家拳). After taking the time to learn and master these skills he undertook the daunting task of assimilating them into his pre-existing Fanziquan sets. Some earlier exponents nicknamed it "Ying Quan/Eagle Fist" due to the numerous grabbing skills present.

Qing dynasty

In 1644 the Ming dynasty was overthrown and replaced by the Qing dynasty. The earliest mention of a traceable lineage of Eagle Claw comes from the Liu Family of Hebei Province.

Liu Shi Jun and Liu Cheng You

Liu Shi Jun (劉士俊劉仕俊(1827？-1910) (fl. 19th century) of Xiong County, Baoding City, Hebei is considered the Sijo (founder/ancestor) of the yīng zhuǎ fān zi quán (鷹爪翻子拳). He took up martial arts at an early age and studied under several exponents of Shaolin kungfu, Fanzi, and possibly Chuojiao and Liuhe boxing which were around at the time. Around middle age, he learned Yue Shi San Shouand Fanzi from Fa Cheng - Fa Seng (法成僧) and Dao Ji Seng (道濟僧). He later was appointed as the military arts instructor for one of the barracks in the capital city of Beijing. He taught the troops fist and spear skills. His students were Liu Cheng You (劉成有), Liu Dekuan (劉德寬), Ji Zixiu (纪子修), Xu Liu, Ji De, Li Zhengsheng and others.

Liu Cheng You (劉成有) first learned martial arts from his uncle Liu Dekuan (劉德寬), who had been a student of Liu Shi Jun when stationed in Beijing. He continued his instruction under other prominent martial artist of the region such as "Dong Xianzhou (Ba Shan Fan) and Yang Jingshan nicknamed "flying Legs". He later received advanced training under Liu Shi Jun when he retired to his home village. Liu Chen You turned out to be a very strict teacher and only accepted a few students.  The main 2 were Liu Qi Wen (劉啟文) & Chen Zizheng (陳子正).  From them the system expanded and became popular when associated with the famous Chin Woo Association.  Many of their students became  prolific teachers that helped spread the system throughout Asia were: Zhang Zhan Wen (张詹文) Liu Zhi Xiang, Liu Zhan Wu, Lei Peixian, Bao Xi Yong, Chen Go Qing, Guo Cheng Yao, Li Bao Ying,Liu Shu Yan 劉書彦, Liu Fa Meng, Zhang Jung Ting, etc.

Chin Woo Athletic Association

The Chin Woo Athletic Association was fronted by the famed martial artist Huo Yuanjia in Shanghai. Its purpose was the dissemination of not only Martial Arts but sports and other educational systems to the public. The Eagle Claw system remained relatively restricted to the Xiong County, Baoding City in Hebei until Chen Zizheng was invited to teach at the Chin Wu.

After initial success with the first School in Shanghai, Chen went to his training brother Liu Qi Wen to offer his students careers as Martial Arts instructors in the Chin Woo Association. In time, Eagle Claw was being taught in Shanghai, Hong Kong, Guandong, Futsan, Singapore, Malaysia etc.

Lineages 

There are 3 main Eagle Claw lineages known that most teachers/schools can trace their style to.

Liu Qiwen (劉啟文) (Lau Kai Man)
Chen Zizheng (陳子正) (Chan Tzi Ching)
Zhang Zhan Wen (张詹文) (Chian Jin Man)

Lineages Outside Asia

United States:
 Shum Leung 岑亮 (NYC) - Instructor: Ng Wai Nung 吳惠農 (student of Chan Tzi Ching, Lee Pu Yin, and Lau Fat Mang 劉法孟)
 Lily Lau 劉莉莉 (Liu LiLi) (California) - Instructor: Lau Fat Mang 劉法孟 (student of Lau Kai Man)
 Gini Lau 劉曼雲 (Liu Man Yuen)(California) - Instructor: Lau Fat Mang 劉法孟 (student of Lau Kai Man)
 James Lau Chi Kin 劉志堅 (Liu Zhikin) - Instructor: Lau Fat Mang (student of Lau Kai Man)
 Fu Leung - Instructor: God Father & Lau Chi Kin

Brazil:
 Li Wing Kay 李榮基 - Instructor: Lau Fat Mang 劉法孟 (student of Lau Kai Man)
 Chan Kwok Wai 陳國偉 - Instructor: Zhang Zhan Wen 张詹文 (student of Liu Cheng You)

United Kingdom:
 Julian Dale 道志鸿 -  Lineage Instructor  Chen Jun Xin 陳俊新 (student of Yin Zhi Jiang 尹志江 & Liu Shu Yan 劉書彦) (Instructor #1: Fu Leung  - Instructor #2 Gini Lau )

Training

How the Eagle Claw system is taught varies between each teacher's skill and experiences. What is consistent of an Eagle Claw Master is their knowledge of the 3 core Hand sets of the style and the Spear.

Xíng Quán (行拳) is known as the "Walking Fist." This set consists of ten to twelve rows of techniques representative of what is today known as Shaolin Fanziquan.
Lián Quán (連拳) is known as the "Linking Fist." A very important set consisting of 50 short lines/rows repeting techniques on both the left side and right side, in that it not only provides the exponent with an encyclopedic base of the various seizing, grappling and joint-locks of qinna, but it also incorporates various Qigong skills as well. Based on Older Fanzi Routines that were combined and restructured by the Eagle Claw King Chen Zi Zheng.  Most have nicknamed this set the "Dictionary of Eagle Claw" due to the content containing probably 90% of the style's skills and techniques taught within 50 Rows.
Yuè Shì Sàn Shǒu (岳氏散手; Yue Clan Free Hand) (aka Yī Bǎi Ling Bā Qín Ná 一百零八擒拿 – 108 Seizing Grabbing techniques) is considered the "heart" of the Eagle Claw system. It is believed to be the original material passed down by the style's legendary founder Yue Fei. This material has 108 different categories of skills/techniques that are trained to a level of perfection with partners. One thing to remember is that each sequence is only an example of that category which contains numerous variations and offshoots.

Other Hand Forms:

Sì Liù Quán (四六拳)、Four Six Fist

Bā Bù Liánhuán Quán (八步連環拳)、Eight Step Linked Fist

Shàolín Chuí (少林捶)、Young Forest Hammers

Wǔ Hǔ Quán (五虎拳)、Five Tiger Fist

Wǔ Huā Bào (五花豹)、Five Flower Leopard

Liùhé Quán (六合拳)、Six Harmony Fist

Bā Bù Chuí (八步捶)、Eight Step Hammers

Tài zǔ Quán (太祖拳)、Great Ancestor Fist

Dà Xióng Quán (大雄拳)、Great Hero Fist

Xiǎo Xióng Quán (小雄拳)、Small Hero Fist

Dà Mián Zhǎng (大綿掌)、Great Cotton Fist

Xiǎo Mián Zhǎng (小綿掌) 、Small Cotton Fist

Dà Bā Miàn (大八面)、Great Eight Expanses

Xiǎo Bā Miàn (小八面)、Small Eight Expanses

Yàn Háng Quán (雁行拳)、Flying Goose Fist

Qián Liū Shì (前溜勢)、Slip Forward Power

Méihuā Quán (梅花拳)、Plum Blossom Boxing

Luóhàn Quán (羅漢拳)、Arhat Boxing

Zuì Liù Tǎng (醉六躺)、Drunk Six Laying

etc...

Qiang/Cheung (枪) -Spear is the primary Weapon associated with the Eagle Claw Style. There is no consensus as to what the original spear routine was as numerous diverse sets exist in the different branches. It is felt that there were mainly loose skills that one would practice singularly then against an opponent. Legend tells us that Yue Fei's was called Lì Quán Qiāng (沥泉枪; Trickling Fountain Spear) which is still taught as part of the Yuèjiā (岳家) System preserved by Zhang Lan Yei, 26th generation inheritor of Yue Family Fist.

Various sets and routines that exist(ed) are:

Sān Bù Qiāng (三步槍)、 Three Step Spear

Liùhé Qiāng (六合槍)、Six Harmony Spear

Méihuā Qiāng (梅花槍)、Plum Flower Spear

Luóhàn Qiāng (羅漢槍)、Arhat Spear

Shàolín Qiāng (少林槍)、 Young Forest Spear

Líhuā Qiāng (梨花槍)、Pear Blossom Spear

Liánhuán Qiāng (連環槍)、Linked Spear

Liùhé Dà Qiāng (六合大槍)、Six Harmony Great Spear

etc...

And with these single person routines there exist numerous partner sets that are paired against the spear:  Empty Hands, Saber, Spear, Guandao, Three-Sectional Staff, Daggers and straight sword, etc.

Other Weapon Forms:

Pole Forms:

Qí méi gùn (齊眉棍)、Eyebrow Pole

Qí mén gùn (奇門棍), Strange Gate Pole

Single Saber Forms:

Méihuā dāndāo (梅花單刀)、Plum Flower Single Saber

Liánhuán dāndāo (連環單刀)、Linked Single Saber

Liùhé dāndāo (六合單刀)、Six Harmony Single Saber

Wǔ hóu dāndāo (五侯單刀)、Five Nobles Single Saber

Double Saber Forms:

Méihuā shuāng dāo (梅花雙刀)、Plum Flower Double Sabers

Xuěpiàn shuāng dāo (雪片雙刀)、Snowflake Double Sabers

De tǎng shuāng dāo (地躺雙刀)、Ground Laying Double Sabers

Sword Forms:

Dà liánhuán jiàn (大連環劍)、Great Linked Sword

Xiǎo liánhuán jiàn (小連環劍)、Small Linked Sword

Pole Cleaver Forms:

Chūnqiū dàdāo* (春秋大刀)、Spring & Autumn Great Blade

Sì mén dàdāo (四門大刀)、Four Gates Great Blade

etc.。

* Dadao translates literally as great blade. It refers to a pole-blade, pole-cleaver, or sword-staff; otherwise known as a glaive, voulge, guisarme, or falchion in English.

** Tài (太) implies great, grand or esteemed. Dà (大) implies big or large. xiǎo (小) implies small, Shào implies young or new.

References

External links
History of Fanzi/Bashanfan. Satirio.com. Accessed 2/26/2010.
History of Ying Men Quan. Satirio.com. Accessed 2/26/2010.

Chinese martial arts